Kalateh-ye Bazdid (also Romanized as Kalāteh-ye Bāzdīd) is a village in Mud Rural District, Mud District, Sarbisheh County, South Khorasan Province, Iran. At the 2006 census, its population was 45, in 17 families.

References 

Populated places in Sarbisheh County